The Pfitschtal or Pfitscher Tal is a valley in South Tyrol, Italy.

The Italian name Val di Vizze is used both for the valley and for the municipality of Pfitsch.

References 
Alpenverein South Tyrol

External links 

Valleys of South Tyrol